The Yomiuri Shimbun Group is a Japanese media conglomerate, and theholding company of Yomiuri Shimbun, a newspaper company.

Overview 
On July 1, 2002, Yomiuri Shimbun was divided into two companies: the holding company Yomiuri Shimbun, and the Yomiuri Shimbun Tokyo Headquarter, which was responsible for publication of newspapers. At the same time, one of the subsidiary company, Yomiuri Co., Ltd., was absorbed and split. As a result, "Yomiuri Shimbun" became a general term referring to Yomiuri Shimbun's Tokyo Headquarter, as well as its Osaka Headquarter and Western Headquarter.

Currently, the Yomiuri Shimbun Group is a holding company, consisting of aforementioned three Headquarters that publish newspapers; a publishin company named Chuokoron Shinsha; the management base of the professional baseball team Yomiuri Giants; and a number of amusement parks, leisure and public sports facilities such as Yomiuri Land. In addition, by making it a holding company, the Osaka Headquarter, which was the only one of the three headquarters that survived before the liquidation, became a pure operating company, and the shares of the broadcasting station, etc. owned by the company were absorbed by corporate split.

History 

 April of 1870 (Meiji 3): Established as a partnership company called "Nisshusha"  in present-day Naka Ward, Yokohama, Kanagawa Prefecture.
 January of 1873 (Meiji 6): Published the English-Japanese dictionary, Eiwa Jii .
 November 2, 1874 (Meiji 7): Formed Yomiuri Shimbun as the news division of Nisshusha.
 December 1, 1917 (Taisho 6): Nisshusha was renamed Yomiuri Shimbun.
 February 25, 1924 (Taisho 13): Due to financial difficulties, the company was sold to Matsutarō Shōriki, the former director of Metropolitan Police Department.
 December 26, 1934 (Showa 9): Shoriki founded the Great Japan Tokyo Baseball Club, the predecessor of Yomiuri Giants.
 June 10, 1940 (Showa 15): Established the prototype of the current company flag.
 August 5, 1942 (Showa 17): Merged with Hochi Shimbun.
 February 15, 1947 (Showa 22): The company was renamed Yomiuri Kogyo. It acquired all shares of Great Japan Tokyo Baseball Club at the same year.
 January 25, 1950 (Showa 25): Yomiuri Giants separated from Yomiuri Kogyo.
 March 30, 1951 (Showa 26): Yomiuri Giants merged back with Yomiuri Kogyo.
 October 20, 1952 (Showa 27): Established a Headquarter in Osaka.
 November 25, 1952 (Showa 27): "Osaka Yomiuri Newspaper" was launched in Osaka.
 May 1, 1959 (Showa 34): Yomiuri Shimbun established its Hokkaido branch in Sapporo, Hokkaido, and started printing local version of Yomiuri Shimbun newspaper.
 May 25, 1961 (Showa 36): Yomiuri Shimbun established its Hokuriku branch in Takaoka, Toyama Prefecture, and started printing local version of Yomiuri Shimbun newspaper.
 September 23, 1964 (Showa 39): Yomiuri Kogyo started local printing of "Yomiuri Shimbun" under the same of "Yomiuri Shimbun Western Headquarter" in Kokura Ward of Kitakyushu (Now Kokurakita Ward), Fukuoka Prefecture.
 March 25, 1975 (Showa 50): Central Yomiuri Shimbun published "Chubu Yomiuri Shimbun" in Nagoya, Aichi Prefecture.
 February 1, 1988 (Showa 63): Chubu Yomiuri Shimbun merged with Yomiuri Kogyo.
 June 22, 1992 (Heisei 4): Yomiuri Kogyo Co., Ltd. changed its name to Yomiuri Co., Ltd.
 February 1, 1999 (Heisei 11): Acquired Chuokoronsha.
 July 1, 2002 (Heisei 14): Reorganization of the Yomiuri Shimbun Group. The Yomiuri Shimbun split into the operating holding company, Yomiuri Shimbun Group, and the newspaper publishing company, Yomiuri Shimbun Tokyo Headquarter. The Yomiuri Shimbun Western Headquarter and the Yomiuri Giants became independent corporations and entirely owned by the Group. In addition, Yomiuri Shimbun Central Headquarter, which was operated by Yomiuri, was downgraded to the Chubu Branch under the Tokyo Headquarter due to a split merger.
 January 1, 2004 (Heisei 16): Yomiuri Shimbun Western Headquarter moved its operation head office to Akasaka, Chūō Ward, Fukuoka.
 October 1, 2010 (Heisei 22): Yomiuri Shimbun Group Headquarter temporarily moved to 6-17-1 Ginza, Chūō Ward, Tokyo (former headquarter building of Nissan Motor) due to the renovation of the Tokyo Headquarter building in Ōtemachi, Chiyoda Ward, Tokyo. Its telephone number remained unchanged, and its dedicated postal code was changed to 104–8243.
 January 6, 2014 (Heisei 26): Completed the new Tokyo headquarter building (Yomiuri Shimbun Building), and the Headquarter returned to Ginza.
 May 7, 2015 (Heisei 27): The operation headquarter of Chuokoron Shinsha moved from its own building in Kyōbashi, Chūō Ward to the 19th floor of the Yomiuri Shimbun Building in Otemachi.
 July 18, 2017 (Heisei 29): Yomiuri Shimbun Central Branch moved to the office building of Nayabashi East District Urban Redevelopment Building (Terasse Nayabashi) at 1-chome, Sakae, Naka Ward, Nagoya.
 December 25, 2020 (Reiwa 2): Started acquisition of Yomiuri Land.
 March 22, 2021 (Reiwa 3): Yomiuri Land became a subsidiary entirely owned by Yomiuri Shimbun Group.

Status of the major shareholders 
(As of November 27, 2020)

Currently, there are 66 shareholders, of them 3 are corporations (including Shoriki Koseikai), and 63 are individuals. In particular, many of the descendants of Matsutaro Shoriki are among the major individual shareholders.

Toru Shoriki (eldest son of Matsutaro Shoriki), the third largest shareholder, passed away in August 2011, and as of the end of March 2011, his wife (Mineko Shoriki) held 11.86% of the shares. It seems to have been transferred or inherited by his children (Genichiro Shoriki, Mio Shoriki).

The 9th largest shareholder, Yoshiko Shoriki, has the same number of shares held during her lifetime as Mineko Shoriki (Toru Shoriki's wife, died on August 17, 2019).

Board member status 
As of June 6, 2021:

Core companies 
The group headquarter and the following six companies are positioned as the "seven core companies" of the Yomiuri Group:

 Yomiuri Shimbun Tokyo Headquarter (Chiyoda Ward, Tokyo)
 Hokkaido Branch Office (Chūō Ward, Sapporo, Hokkaido)
 Hokuriku Branch Office (Takaoka, Toyama)
 Central Branch Office (Naka Ward, Nagoya, Aichi)
 Yomiuri Shimbun Osaka Headquarter (Kita Ward, Osaka)
 Yomiuri Shimbun Western Headquarter (Chūō Ward, Fukuoka)
 Yomiuri Giants (Chiyoda, Tokyo)
 Chuokoron-Shinsha Ltd. (Chiyoda, Tokyo)
 Yomiuri Land Co. Ltd. (Inagi, Tokyo)
 Yomiuri Land
 Funabashi Racecourse
 Kawasaki Racecourse

Other affiliated companies and corporations 
Excludes six core companies. The order follows the official website.

 Hochi Shimbun Co,.Ltd (Sports Hochi)
 Sports Hochi Western Headquarter
 Fukushima Minyu Shimbun Co,.Ltd (Fukushima Minyu)
 Ryoko Yomiuri Publication Co,.Ltd
 Tokyo Media Production Co,.Ltd
 Nippon Television Holdings Corporation
 Nippon Television Network Corporation
 BS Japan Ltd.
 CS Japan Ltd.
 RF Radio Nippon Ltd.
 NTV Group Planning Inc.
 IKAROS Co.ltd
 Yomiuri Telecasting Corporation Co., Ltd.
 Chūkyō Television Broadcasting Co., Ltd.
 Yomiuri Information Development
 Yomiuri Task
 Yomiuri Information Service
 Yomiuri Computer
 Yomiuri Travel
 Yomiuri Gold Co., Ltd. (Yomiuri Country Club)
 Public Interest Incorporated Foundation Yomiuri Nippon Symphony Orchestra
 Yomiuri Cultural Center Union
 Yomiuri Nippon Television Cultural Center Co., Ltd.
 Osaka Yomiuri Cultural Center Co., Ltd.
 Yomiuri Cultural Center Co., Ltd. (Yomiuri Cultural Center Senri Chuo)
 Yomiuri FBS Cultural Center Co., Ltd.
 Western Yomiuri Cultural Center Co., Ltd. (Yamaguchi Broadcasting Cultural Center)
 School Corporation Institute of Science and Technology
 Marronnier Gate Co., Ltd. (former Printemps Ginza Co., Ltd.)
 Tokyo Yomiuri Service Co., Ltd.
 Osaka Yomiuri Service Co., Ltd.
 Yomiuri Real Estate Co., Ltd. (Yomiuri Guildhall in Yūrakuchō, Tokyo)
 Yomiuri Media Center Ltd.
 Yomix Ltd.
 Yomiuri Systech Ltd.
 Yomiuri Hong Kong Ltd.
 Yomiuri Agency Co., Ltd.
 Social Welfare Corporation Yomiuri Light and Love Corporation

Special Note 

 Tokyo Dome was not an affiliated company of the Yomiuri Shimbun, but Mitsui Fudosan once aimed to acquire 100% of the company's stock, and after succeeding, the Yomiuri Shimbun Group Headquarters will transfer 20% of the stock, and a capital and business alliance between the three parties. Since the contract was signed and it was successful as planned, Yomiuri Shimbun Group Headquarters holds 20% of Tokyo Dome's shares as contracted. Officers from Yomiuri Shimbun Group Headquarter and the Yomiuri Shimbun Tokyo Headquarter were dispatched to participate in the management of the real estate corporation.

Major broadcasters under control 
Under the mass media concentration elimination principle , a board member will be publicly announced as having control over a broadcaster when they possess more than 10% of voting rights on the board. The following companies can be considered to be controlled by Yomiuri Group under this rule:

 Sapporo Television Broadcasting Co., Ltd.
 Aomori FM Broadcasting Co., Ltd.
 Television Iwate Co., Ltd.
 Miyagi Television Broadcasting Co., Ltd.
 FM Yamagata Co., Ltd.
 Fukushima Central Television Co., Ltd.
 Television Niigata Network Co., Ltd.
 TV Shinshu Co., Ltd.
 TV Kanazawa Co., Ltd.
 Shizuoka Daiichi Television Co., Ltd.
 Yomiuri Television Broadcasting Co., Ltd.
 Hiroshima Telecasting Co., Ltd.
 Fukuoka Broadcasting Co., Ltd.
 Television Nagasaki Co., Ltd.
 Kumamoto Kenmin Televisions Co., Ltd.
 Television Oita Co. Ltd.
 TV Miyazaki Co., Ltd.

Company flag, emblem and logo 

The company flag has a triangular red and white striped pattern on its upper right corner, and a square white background with the word "讀賣" (Yomiuri) written in red on the lower left side. The company flag of Yomiuri Telecasting Corporation also use part of the same design.

In addition, in the TV program credits, or in the program produced by the Yomiuri Shimbun during the "news & culture" time of Nippon Telesitas , it used to be written with the same brush as the title (the notation is "Yomiuri Shimbun <sha>"). However, currently, the subtitles of "Yomiuri Shimbun" in blue round characters are used.

In addition, the company emblem is a circle with "Yomiuri". Giants uniforms used to have patches on their sleeves.

Even now, the title is "Yomiuri Shimbun" with "Yomiuri" in the old font, but group companies that have "Yomiuri" in their company name use the new font "Yomiuri" for registration. However, before the group reorganization, Osaka Yomiuri Shimbun , Osaka Yomiuri Television Broadcasting , and Kagoshima Yomiuri Television were registered with the old font of "Yomiuri".

References 

Holding companies of Japan
Newspaper companies of Japan
Japanese companies established in 2002